The Ellermühle Speedway Stadium also known as the OneSolar Arena is a 12,000-capacity motorcycle speedway stadium and driving safety facility, 10km west of Landshut in Germany. The site is directly next to Flugplatz Landshut (Landshut Airport), which is not to be confused Munich airport.

Speedway
The stadium is owned by the Landshut Automobile Club and is the home venue of the speedway team called AC Landshut or the Landshut Devils who race in the Team Speedway Polish Championship.

The Mayor Josef Deimer and ADAC President Franz Stadler opened the stadium on 17 August 1975. The stadium has hosted various international events including the 1978 Speedway World Team Cup and the German Grand Prix during the 1997 Speedway Grand Prix season.

In 2012, the name OneSolar Arena was used due to a new sponsor OneSolar International. The associated buildings of the stadium have a definitive look because of the use of solar panels.

Driver safety
The stadium is also used as an ADAC training facility and the Landshut Traffic Watch also uses the site for this purpose.

References

Speedway venues in Germany